Gärda Svensson (30 August 1895 – 15 June 1985) was a Swedish Bondeförbundet politician. She was a member of the Riksdag 1945-1963. She was the first female member of Bondeförbundet to hold such as position. She was also the head of the party's women section between 1933 and 1966.

Sources

Further reading 
 

1895 births
1985 deaths
Members of the Riksdag from the Centre Party (Sweden)
Women members of the Riksdag
Members of the Första kammaren
20th-century Swedish women politicians
20th-century Swedish politicians